Alejandro José Foglia Costa (born 30 January 1984, in Montevideo) is a Uruguayan sailor in the Laser and Finn classes.

He competed in four Summer Olympics for his native South American country: 2004, 2008, 2012 and 2016,  and in two Pan American Games: 2007 and 2011.

He was named Uruguay's flagbearer for the 2008 Summer Olympics.

Results
Olympic Games
2004: 34th
2008: 17th
2012: 8th
2016: 19th

Pan American Games
2007: ?
2011: 4th

ISAF Sailing World Championships
2007: 18th
2011: 52nd

Personal life
He is brother of Andrea Foglia another Uruguayan sailor

Notes

References

External links
 
 
 

1984 births
Living people
Sportspeople from Montevideo
Uruguayan male sailors (sport)
Sailors at the 2007 Pan American Games
Sailors at the 2011 Pan American Games
Sailors at the 2004 Summer Olympics – Laser
Sailors at the 2008 Summer Olympics – Laser
Sailors at the 2012 Summer Olympics – Laser
Sailors at the 2016 Summer Olympics – Finn
Olympic sailors of Uruguay
Pan American Games competitors for Uruguay
Uruguayan people of Italian descent
Snipe class sailors